Thymelaeoideae is a subfamily of the Thymelaeaceae family.

References 

 
Rosid subfamilies